In shogi, Right Fourth File Rook (右四間飛車 migi shikenbisha) is a Static Rook opening in which the rook is positioned on the fourth file if played by Black or the sixth file if played by White.

Typically, Right Fourth File Rook develops the right silver into a Reclining Silver attacking structure.

Fortress vs Right Fourth File Rook

Right Fourth File Rook vs Fourth File Rook

A Right Fourth File Rook strategy may be played against a Ranging Rook position such as Fourth File Rook. In a Right Fourth File Rook vs Fourth File Rook game, each player's rook will be directly opposing each other on the fourth file supported by attacking silvers. Below shows an example of Black's Right Fourth File Rook against White's Fourth File Rook.

1. P-76 P-34, 2. P-26 P-44, 3. S-48 R-42. The first six moves are standard Static Rook vs Fourth File Rook piece development. (See: Left Silver-57 Rapid Attack vs Fourth File Rook for explication.)

4. P-46. The Right Fourth File Rook opening starts by advancing Black's fourth file pawn. 
This allows an opening for the left silver to pass through the front line of pawns.

White's silver-54 variation

See also

 Fortress opening
 Fourth File Rook
 Static Rook

Notes

References

Bibliography

External links

 Global Shogi: Right 4th File Rook (Migi Shikenbisha-右四間飛車)

Shogi openings
Static Rook openings